Jiaocheng may refer to the following locations in China:

Jiaocheng County (交城县), Lüliang, Shanxi
Jiaocheng District (蕉城区), Ningde, Fujian
Jiaocheng, Jiaoling County (蕉城镇), town in Guangdong